Elise Mertens (born 17 November 1995) is a Belgian professional tennis player. She became world No. 1 in doubles in May 2021, the third Belgian to hold the top ranking across both disciplines after Kim Clijsters and Justine Henin.
Mertens is a three-time Grand Slam champion in doubles, having won the 2019 US Open and 2021 Australian Open partnering Aryna Sabalenka, and the 2021 Wimbledon Championships with Hsieh Su-wei.
Mertens also finished runner-up at the 2022 Wimbledon Championships with Zhang Shuai. Mertens has won 16 doubles titles on the WTA Tour, including the 2022 WTA Finals with Veronika Kudermetova, four at WTA 1000 level, and finished runner-up at the 2021 WTA Finals alongside Hsieh.

She is also a successful singles player, and reached her first major semifinal at the 2018 Australian Open, also reaching the US Open quarterfinals in 2019 and 2020. Mertens achieved her career-high singles ranking of world No. 12 in November 2018, and has won seven WTA Tour titles, including two at WTA 500 level. She has represented Belgium in the Billie Jean King Cup since 2017, and also competed at the 2020 Olympic Games in both singles and doubles.

Personal life
Mertens was born in Leuven, the second daughter of Liliane Barbe, a teacher, and Guido Mertens, who makes furniture for churches. She was home-schooled and enjoyed studying languages, speaking French, English, and Flemish Dutch. Her older sister, Lauren, is currently an airline pilot and introduced the then four-year-old Elise to tennis. While growing up, Mertens looked up to Justine Henin and Kim Clijsters, and was a member of the Kim Clijsters Academy, where she has been training from 2015 until it shut down in 2022.

Tennis career

Early and junior years
Mertens was a doubles finalist at the ITF New Delhi, alongside Marina Melnikova.

She made her WTA Tour main-draw debut at the 2015 Copa Colsanitas in the doubles event, partnering Nastja Kolar. She won her first WTA doubles title at the 2016 Auckland Open, partnering An-Sophie Mestach.

2017: First WTA singles title and top 40 debut
In January, Mertens won the Hobart International, beating No. 3 seed Monica Niculescu in the final. As a result of this she broke into the WTA top 100 for the first time, on 16 January 2017.

After missing the Australian Open qualifying due to her Hobart campaign, Mertens reached the first round of the St. Petersburg Trophy through qualifying, and lost to Kristina Mladenovic in straight sets. She then competed at the Dubai Championships, where, as a qualifier, she beat Tsvetana Pironkova en route to the second round, where she lost to Agnieszka Radwańska. Despite her loss, Mertens reached a new career-ranking of world No. 69. She then lost in the first round of the Malaysian Open to qualifier and eventual quarterfinalist Lesley Kerkhove. After that, she failed to qualify to both Indian Wells and Miami Open, losing in the first round of qualifying to Sachia Vickery and Alison Van Uytvanck, respectively.

At the Ladies Open Biel Bienne, Mertens upset No. 8 seed Monica Niculescu and beat Mona Barthel en route to the quarterfinals, losing there to eventual finalist Anett Kontaveit.

2018: First Major semifinal, three singles titles, Masters doubles title & two singles quarterfinals 

Mertens began the season by becoming the first woman to win back-to-back titles in Hobart. She defeated Mihaela Buzărnescu in the final, defending her title from 2017. Along with Demi Schuurs, she also won the doubles title.

Mertens' season continued with her main-draw debut at the Australian Open. She defeated qualifier Viktória Kužmová, 23rd seed Daria Gavrilova, Alizé Cornet and Petra Martić, all in straight sets, to advance to her first Grand Slam quarterfinal. In the quarterfinal, Mertens achieved her first victory over a top five ranked player, defeating Elina Svitolina, again in straight sets. With her win over Svitolina, Mertens became the third Belgian woman to reach the last four at the tournament, joining former ranking leaders Justine Henin and Kim Clijsters. In the semifinals she lost to Caroline Wozniacki, in straight sets.

After her good form in Australia, Mertens had some difficult weeks. She lost, respectively, in the first round of Doha, Dubai and Indian Wells and in the second round in Miami. In April, she reached her fourth singles final and second of the year at the Lugano Open in Switzerland. She won the title by beating Belarusian Aryna Sabalenka in straight sets. Together with compatriot Kirsten Flipkens, she also won the doubles title. Two weeks later, she also won the singles title at the Morocco Open by defeating Australian Ajla Tomljanović, in straight sets.

Mertens lost in the second round at Madrid to top seed Simona Halep. She reached the fourth round at the French Open, defeating Varvara Lepchenko, Heather Watson, and Daria Gavrilova before falling again to Halep, who went on to win the title. Seeded second at 's Hertogenbosch, she lost in the second round to Antonia Lottner.

Mertens started off the grass-court season with first-round loss to qualifier Dalila Jakupović in Birmingham. In Eastbourne, she lost in third round to Aryna Sabalenka. At Wimbledon, Mertens lost in third round to Dominika Cibulková.

In the American swing, Mertens reached the semifinals in San Jose as well as quarterfinals in Montreal and Cincinnati. In doubles, she ended runner-up in Cincinnati and won the final in Wuhan, partnering Demi Schuurs.

2019: First Premier title, Sunshine Double and US Open title in doubles

Mertens started in Brisbane with a first-round exit against top-10 player and sixth seed Kiki Bertens, she lost the match in three sets. Then in Sydney, she got her first two wins of the season by defeating Katerina Siniaková and Anett Kontaveit before losing in the quarterfinals to Ashleigh Barty.

Defending semifinalist points from last year, she entered the Australian Open as the 12th seed. She won her first and second match in straight sets, before falling to 17th seed Madison Keys in the third round. Due to her early exit, her ranking fell to No. 21.

Mertens played Fed Cup in her homecountry for the first time. She was unable to win her two matches against Alizé Cornet and Caroline Garcia. In the week after, she moved to Doha to play the Qatar Open. She began unseeded at this tournament, but she surprisingly won her first Premier title. On her route to the tournament win, she took the scalp of three top-10 players, including Kiki Bertens, Angelique Kerber and world No. 2, Simona Halep. After her biggest career win to date, she came back in the top 20 at No. 16.

Just two days later, Mertens played in Dubai, where she was placed as 16th seed. She lost in her opening-match against qualifier Zhu Lin, after a battle of nearly three hours.

In March at Indian Wells, as the 16th seeded, she lost in the third round in another battle near three hours against 18th seed Wang Qiang. Even though she lost early in singles, she was able to win a big doubles title alongside Sabalenka at Indian Wells, defeating first seeds Barbora Krejčíková and Kateřina Siniaková in the final. Two weeks later, the pair also won the Miami Open doubles title, completing the Sunshine Double. Mertens and Sabalenka became just the fifth doubles pairing in history, and first since Martina Hingis and Sania Mirza in 2015, to complete the Sunshine Double in doubles. These titles took Mertens inside the top 10 in doubles for the first time.

Mertens had a rough start to the clay-court season, losing in the opening round of four of her first five tournaments (the exception being a quarterfinal appearance in Morocco where she was upset by the eventual tournament champion Maria Sakkari). Seeded 20th at the French Open, Mertens beat Tamara Zidanšek and Diane Parry to advance to the third round, where she was beaten by 12th seed Anastasija Sevastova in a three hour 18-minute match three-set match, despite winning the first set and holding five match points in the decider. Mertens and Sabalenka performed well in the doubles draw, where they were seeded sixth. The pair reached the semifinals, in which they were defeated by second seeds and eventual champions, Tímea Babos and Kristina Mladenovic.

Mertens performed much stronger in the grass-court season warmup events, making the quarterfinals in Mallorca and the third round in Eastbourne (in both tournaments she lost to the eventual champions, Sofia Kenin and Karolína Plíšková, respectively). Seeded 21st at Wimbledon, Mertens advanced to the fourth round for the first time, taking out Fiona Ferro, Monica Niculescu and 15th seed Wang Qiang. However, she was upset by world No. 54, Barbora Strýcová, after having a one-set lead. In doubles, Mertens and Sabalenka advanced to the quarterfinals, but were defeated by eventual champions Strýcová and Hsieh Su-wei, the second consecutive major the pair lost to the team that would go on to win the tournament.

In the early summer hardcourt season, Mertens struggled to replicate her 2018 success, losing her opening round match in San Jose to Kristie Ahn and falling in the second round of Toronto and Cincinnati to Serena Williams and Elina Svitolina, respectively. At the US Open, in September, Mertens was seeded 25th in singles. She defeated Jil Teichmann, Kristýna Plíšková, and former world No. 9, Andrea Petkovic, in straight sets, before taking revenge on wildcard Kristie Ahn to reach her second Grand Slam singles quarterfinal, becoming the first Belgian woman to reach the last eight since Kim Clijsters won the title in 2010. She once again squandered a one-set lead, going down in three sets to world No. 15 and the eventual champion, Bianca Andreescu. Playing doubles with Sabalenka, the pair reached the final with ease, dropping just one set along the way. The pair then defeated Victoria Azarenka and Ashleigh Barty in the final, winning their first Grand Slam doubles title both as a team and individually. Mertens became the first Belgian to reach a US Open final, as well as winning one, in doubles, and the first Belgian woman to win a Grand Slam doubles title since Clijsters won Wimbledon in 2003. Following the tournament, she reached a new career-high doubles ranking of No. 2 in the world.

Mertens failed to register much success in singles during the Asian hardcourt swing, outside of a semifinal appearance at the Pan Pacific Open, but reached her fourth doubles final of the year with Sabalenka at the Premier 5-level Wuhan Open, where the pair lost to Duan Yingying and Veronika Kudermetova. Mertens' consistency in both disciplines qualified her to compete in both year-end tournaments. She first competed at the WTA Elite Trophy in singles, where she qualified for the second straight year. Drawn in the same group as her doubles partner Sabalenka, she was beaten in three close sets by the Belarusian before defeating Sakkari in three sets. Placing second in her round-robin group, she failed to advance to her semifinals (Sabalenka won the title). She next competed at the WTA Finals in Shenzhen, playing doubles. The pair fell to Babos and Mladenovic in three sets before recording a straight sets win over the Taiwanese sisters Chan Hao-ching and Latisha Chan. Needing a win over Anna-Lena Grönefeld and Demi Schuurs to advance to the semifinals, they were beaten in three close sets, ending their tournament and season. She finished the year ranked No. 17 in singles and No. 6 in the world in doubles.

2020: Two singles WTA finals, Cincinnati and US Open quarterfinals 
Mertens opened the year by reaching the quarterfinals in both Shenzhen, where she was beaten by Elena Rybakina, and Hobart, losing to Heather Watson. Seeded 16th at the Australian Open, Mertens eased through to the fourth round with straight-set wins over Danka Kovinić, Watson and CiCi Bellis before being defeated by Simona Halep. In doubles, Mertens and Sabalenka reached the quarterfinals where they lost to Chan Hao-ching and Latisha Chan. After losing early in both Dubai and Doha, Mertens was next scheduled to play in Indian Wells, but the tournament was cancelled and the tour suspended due to the COVID-19 pandemic.

When the tour resumed in August, Mertens lost her opening match in Palermo, but bounced back by reaching her first final of the year at the Prague Open. She then lost to Halep for the second time that year. At the Cincinnati Open, Mertens advanced to her first ever Premier 5 semifinal, where she was beaten by Naomi Osaka in straight sets.

Seeded 16th at the 2020 US Open, Mertens opened her campaign by beating Laura Siegemund in straight sets, followed by two-set wins over Sara Sorribes Tormo and 18-year old Caty McNally. She then caused a huge upset by defeating the second seed and reigning Australian Open champion Sofia Kenin in straight sets, making it to the quarterfinals of the US Open for the second consecutive year. However, she was thrashed in the quarterfinal by former world No. 1, Victoria Azarenka, winning just one game. Mertens and Sabalenka also played doubles together, where they were the defending champions. They were beaten in the quarterfinals by the eventual champions Siegemund and Zvonareva.

Mertens continued in good form throughout to the end of the year. She made quarterfinals at Rome, losing again to Karolina Plíšková in three sets. She lost in the third round of the French Open to Caroline Garcia. She then went to the Ostrava Open and defeated Amanda Anisimova and Karolína Muchová both in straight sets. She eventually lost in a rematch against Azarenka however with a closer scoreline this time. She did not leave empty handed though, as her and Aryna Sabalenka took the doubles title together. She finished off the year with a final finish at Linz Open losing to Sabalenka a couple weeks after winning a title together.

2021: Australian Open and Wimbledon doubles titles and world No. 1 in doubles, Olympics debut
Mertens started off her 2021 season at the first edition of the Gippsland Trophy. Seeded seventh, she won her sixth WTA singles title beating Kaia Kanepi in the final. This was her first singles title in two years. Seeded 18th at the Australian Open, she eliminated 11th seed, Belinda Bencic, in the third round. Her winning streak at the start of the season ended at seven when she lost to 25th seed, Karolína Muchová, in the fourth round. In doubles, she and Sabalenka won their second Grand Slam title as a team defeating Barbora Krejčíková and Kateřina Siniaková in the championship match.

Mertens continued her good run of form since the end of lockdown at the Dubai Tennis Championships. Seeded tenth, she reached the semifinals where she fell to ninth seed Garbine Muguruza. Seeded 16th at the Miami Open, she made the fourth round where she was beaten by second seed, Naomi Osaka, who was on a 20-match-win streak at the time.

Mertens began her clay-court season at the Charleston Open. Seeded seventh, she suffered a second-round upset at the hands of Alizé Cornet. As the top seed at the İstanbul Cup, she made it to the final where she lost to Sorana Cîrstea. As the top seed in doubles alongside Kudermetova, they won the title beating Nao Hibino and Makoto Ninomiya in the final. Seeded 13th at the Madrid Open, she upset world No. 3 and two-time champion, Simona Halep, in the third round. In the quarterfinals, she retired during her match against world No. 7 and fifth seed, Aryna Sabalenka, due to a left thigh injury. As the top seed in doubles with partner Hsieh Su-wei, they lost in the second round to Jeļena Ostapenko and Anastasia Pavlyuchenkova. Despite the loss, Mertens hit a huge milestone in her doubles career on 10 May 2021 by becoming the world No. 1 for the first time, joining Kim Clijsters as the second Belgian player to do so. Seeded 14th in Rome, she fell in the first round to Kudermetova. Seeded 14th at the French Open, she reached the third round but lost to world No. 18 and eventual semifinalist, Maria Sakkari, in three sets. In doubles, she and Su-wei were defeated in the third round by eventual finalists Bethanie Mattek-Sands and Iga Świątek despite having had seven match points.

Mertens kicked off her grass-court season at the Birmingham Classic. As the top seed, she lost her first-round match to Ajla Tomljanović in three sets which all were tie-breaks. In the doubles event with Hsieh, they reached the semifinals and lost to Ons Jabeur and Ellen Perez. After Birmingham, Mertens competed at the Eastbourne International where she was the seventh seed. Despite winning the first set 6-0, she was beaten in the first round by Coco Gauff. Seeded 13th at Wimbledon, she lost in the third round to 23rd seed Madison Keys. In doubles, again partnering Hsieh, she reached the final. In the final, they faced the pair of Elena Vesnina and Veronika Kudermetova. In a tight match, they fought back, after having lost the first set and their opponents serving for the championship in both the second and third sets, saving two championship points in the former, and Mertens failing to successfully serve for the championship herself, to win the title. In the process, she became the first Belgian player to win three overall as well as different Grand Slam titles in doubles and kept her unbeaten record in Grand Slam finals intact. By reaching the final and winning the title, she regained the world No. 1 spot she held previously for a week in May 2021.

The week of July 24th saw Mertens representing Belgium at the Tokyo Summer Olympics. Seeded 12th, she fell in the first round to Ekaterina Alexandrova.

Mertens got her US Open preparation underway at the Silicon Valley Classic. As the top seed, she reached the semifinals where she lost to fourth seed Daria Kasatkina. Seeded ninth at the Canadian Open in Montreal, she was defeated in the first round by eventual champion Camila Giorgi. Seeded 15th at the Western & Southern Open in Cincinnati, she was ousted from the tournament in the second round by Elena Rybakina. Seeded 15th at the US Open, she beat 20th seed, Ons Jabeur, in the third round. She was eliminated in the fourth round by world No. 2 and second seed, Aryna Sabalenka. As the top seed in doubles alongside Hsieh Su-wei, they reached the quarterfinals where they lost to 11th seeded team and eventual finalists, Coco Gauff and Caty McNally.

Seeded second at the Luxembourg Open, Mertens reached the quarterfinals where she lost to fifth seed Markéta Vondroušová. Seeded seventh at the first edition of the Chicago Classic, she was defeated in the third round by tenth seed Danielle Collins. Seeded 14th at the Indian Wells Open, she suffered a second-round loss at the hands of lucky loser Jasmine Paolini. In doubles, she and Hsieh won the doubles title by defeating Veronika Kudermetova and Elena Rybakina in the final. It was Mertens's second Indian Wells doubles title. With the victory, she regained the doubles No. 1 ranking. At the end of 2021 she decided to stop her longstanding collaboration with her coach Ceyssens, choosing Simon Goffin, David Goffin’s brother instead.

2022: WTA Finals champion & Wimbledon finalist in doubles; 7th singles title
Mertens started her 2022 season at the Sydney Classic where she lost to Daria Kasatkina in the second round. Seeded 19th at the Australian Open, she reached the fourth round where she was defeated by 27th seed and eventual finalist, Danielle Collins. Seeded third in doubles, she reached the semifinals with new partner, Veronika Kudermetova, where they lost to eventual champions Barbora Krejčíková and Kateřina Siniaková.

Seeded eighth at the St. Petersburg Trophy, Mertens fell in the quarterfinals to top seed and eventual finalist, Maria Sakkari. In Dubai, she was eliminated from the tournament in the first round by lucky loser and last year semifinalist, Jil Teichmann. She won her fifteenth doubles title with Kudermetova, defeating Jeļena Ostapenko and Lyudmyla Kichenok in the final. Seeded 16th at the Qatar Open, she won her second-round match when her opponent, two-time champion Petra Kvitová, retired due to a left wrist injury. She was beaten in the third round by fourth seed and eventual finalist, Anett Kontaveit. In doubles, she and Kudermetova reached the final which they lost to Coco Gauff and Jessica Pegula. Seeded 20th at the Indian Wells Open, she lost in the third round to qualifier Daria Saville. As the top seed and defending champion in doubles, she and Kudermetova were defeated in the first round by Eri Hozumi and Makoto Ninomiya. Seeded 20th at the Miami Open, she lost in the second round to Czech wildcard Linda Fruhvirtová. As the top seed in doubles alongside Kudermetova, they made it to the final where they lost to Laura Siegemund and Vera Zvonareva.

Mertens began her clay-court season at the İstanbul Cup. As the top seed and last year finalist, she retired during her first-round match against Rebecca Peterson due to a right leg injury. Mertens returned to action during the week of May 15th at Strasbourg. Seeded fourth, she lost in the quarterfinals to eventual finalist Kaja Juvan. In doubles, she and partner, Diane Parry, reached the semifinals where they fell to Nicole Melichar-Martinez and Daria Saville. Seeded 31st at Roland Garros, she reached the fourth round where she lost to 18th seed and eventual finalist, Coco Gauff. Seeded second in doubles, she and Kudermetova lost in the third round to 13th seeded team of Xu Yifan and Yang Zhaoxuan. Despite the third round loss, she regained her No. 1 ranking in doubles following the conclusion of the tournament on 6 June 2022.

Starting her grass-court season seeded eighth at the Libéma Open, Mertens lost in the second round to compatriot Alison Van Uytvanck. Seeded fourth at the Birmingham Classic, she was defeated in the first round by qualifier Caty McNally. In doubles, she and Zhang Shuai, as the top seeds, made it to the final. Unfortunately, they handed Lyudmyla Kichenok and Jeļena Ostapenko a walkover in the final due to a back injury Zhang suffered during her singles final match. Seeded 13th at the Eastbourne International, she was beaten in the second round by qualifier and compatriot, Kirsten Flipkens. Seeded 24th at Wimbledon, she upset 2018 champion and 15th seed, Angelique Kerber, in the third round. She lost in the fourth round to third seed and eventual finalist, Ons Jabeur. Following a seven-month partnership, she announced her split from coach Simon Goffin. As the top seed in doubles with Zhang, she reached the final for a second consecutive time at this major. They lost in the championship match to second seeded team Barbora Krejčíková and Kateřina Siniaková. Mertens withdrew prior to the 2022 Tennis in the Land feeling pain in her right thigh, yet still decided to go to the US Open. She lost in the first round of singles to Irina-Camelia Begu, and as the top seed of the US Open in doubles, partnering Kudermetova, won the first round but withdrew prior to round two due to the leg injury.

Mertens returned back from injury at the Pan Pacific Open. She lost in the second round to Claire Liu in singles but reached the doubles' semifinals partnering Kudermetova. Elise finally broke her poor run of form at the Jasmin Open as she stormed into her first singles final in almost 14 months. She defeated Jaqueline Cristian, Despina Papamichail, Moyuka Uchijima and avenged her last loss to Claire Liu in route to the final. In the final, she cruised past Alizé Cornet losing just two games to win her seventh WTA Tour title in Monastir .

In Guadalajara, Mertens lost to Anna Kalinskaya in the second round but she reached the doubles quarterfinal with Kudermetova and qualified for the WTA Finals in doubles for a fourth consecutive year with four different partners. In Fort Worth, Mertens along with Kudermetova raced into the doubles final, as they finish 3-0 in the round robin stage and eased past Desirae Krawczyk/Demi Schuurs in the semifinals. In the final, they came back from 2-7 down in the match-tiebreak to outlast defending champions & six time Grand Slam champions Barbora Krejčíková/Kateřina Siniaková and win their third doubles title together. This made Mertens the first Belgian to win the World Tour Finals in doubles.

Playing style
Mertens is a baseline player, whose game blends her excellent defensive skills with aggressive shot making capabilities. Her groundstrokes are hit very flat, with little topspin applied, allowing her shots to penetrate consistently deep into the court, despite Mertens' comparatively slight build. Although both her groundstrokes are reliable, her backhand is stronger, and is responsible for the majority of winners she accumulates on the court; she particularly excels at redirecting power down the line with her backhand. When in good form, Mertens hits a significant number of winners, although this can be accompanied by a large number of unforced errors. One of Mertens' major weapons is her return of serve, hitting many return winners, and effectively neutralising powerful first serves. Mertens' serve is strong, with her first serve peaking at 115 mph (185 km/h) and averaging at 99 mph (159 km/h), allowing her to serve multiple aces in any match; her first serve isn't reliable, however, with her first serve percentage typically averaging 58%. To minimise double faults, however, Mertens possesses an effective second serve, which has a tremendous amount of kick, averaging 79 mph (127 km/h); this also prevents opponents from scoring free points off her second serve. Due to her increasing doubles experience, Mertens is a highly effective net player, and frequently chooses to finish points at the net. Mertens' superlative fitness, stamina, speed, footwork, and court coverage allow her to excel at counterpunching, and extend points until she creates the opportunity to hit low-risk winners; as such, she is one of the most effective players on the WTA Tour at turning defence into offence, due to her excellent point construction. Mertens possesses extreme mental toughness, and has been noted for her consistency and determination on court, making her a formidable opponent. Mertens has stated that her favourite surface is grass, although the vast majority of her success has come on hard courts.

Career statistics

Grand Slam tournament performance timelines

Singles

Doubles

Grand Slam tournament finals

Doubles: 4 (3 titles, 1 runner-up)

Year-end championships finals

Doubles: 2 (1 title, 1 runner-up)

References

External links

 
 
 
 
 
 

1995 births
Living people
Belgian female tennis players
Sportspeople from Leuven
Olympic tennis players of Belgium
Hopman Cup competitors
US Open (tennis) champions
Grand Slam (tennis) champions in women's doubles
Tennis players at the 2020 Summer Olympics
WTA number 1 ranked doubles tennis players